John Tewkesbury (died 20 December 1531) was a Paternoster Row leather merchant in London and Protestant reformer, convicted of heresy and burned at the stake in West Smithfield, London, on 20 December 1531.

Protestant conversion
In 1512, Tewkesbury came into the possession of a manuscript copy of the Bible.  He later bought an English language translation of the New Testament (1526) by William Tyndale.  "He was a clever and eloquent man and a man of influence in London.  He was one of the most knowledgeable of the Scriptures of all the evangelicals."  He was converted by reading Tyndale's New Testament and The Parable of the Wicked Mammon (1528).

Bishops' interrogation

Arrest
On Wednesday 21 April 1529 Tewkesbury was arrested and brought before Cuthbert Tunstall, Bishop of London, and his assistants, Henry Standish, bishop of St. Asaph, and John Islip, abbot of Westminster.  Tewkesbury's eloquence stunned the bishops.  Realizing that he could effectively argue through Scripture, they decided further inquiry was in order.

Later that month, Tewkesbury was examined before the bishops Cuthbert Tunstall of London, Nicholas West of Ely, John Longland of Lincoln, and John Clerk of Bath and Wells regarding The Wicked Mammon, which he had sold.  He was questioned regarding nineteen articles from the book. His final reply was, "I pray you reform yourself, and if there be any error in the book, let it be reformed.  I think it is good enough."

He was ordered to appear the following day, before John Cox, vicar-general to the archbishop of Canterbury, Galfride Warton, Rowland Philips, William Philow, and Robert Ridley, professors of divinity.  Tewkesbury appeared again and was examined on five articles from The Wicked Mammon.  The consensus among the inquisitors was that knowledge and independent thinking by the laity was even more dangerous than the heresy of some priests.

Punishment

On 8 May, he was ordered to carry a bundle of sticks at St. Paul's Church on the following Sunday.  He was to carry a bundle of sticks other places on the following week and wear sticks embroidered on both sleeves.  He was also ordered to enter the monastery of St. Bartholomew's on Whitsunday eve (30  May) and remain there until released by the Bishop.  Following his incarceration at the monastery, he renounced his prior beliefs and was released.

Sir Thomas More's interrogation

Betrayal
In close co-operation with Cuthbert Tunstall's successor, John Stokesley, Sir Thomas More, High Chancellor of England, arrested George Constantine, a Protestant book dealer, for heresy in 1531.  Before escaping in early December, Constantine revealed the names of several fellow reformers.

Following his betrayal by Constantine, Tewkesbury was immediately arrested and held in the porter's lodge at More's Chelsea house.

Confession
The popular anti-Catholic polemicist John Foxe claims More had Tewkesbury pinioned "hand, foot, and head in the stocks" for six days before having him whipped at "Jesu's tree" in his garden, "and also twisted his brows with small ropes, so that the blood started out of his eyes".  More himself, however, denied such claims in his "Apology" (1533), which were popular at the time:

Stories of a similar nature were current even in More's lifetime and he denied them forcefully. He admitted that he did imprison heretics in his house – 'theyr sure kepynge' – he called it – but he utterly rejected claims of torture and whipping... 'as help me God.'

Tewkesbury was subsequently moved to the Tower of London and confessed that he had read The Obedience of a Christian Man and The Wicked Mammon since recanting his beliefs two years earlier.  He also confessed to removing the embroidered twigs from his sleeves and other alleged heresies.

Execution
The sentence against John Tewkesbury was read and pronounced by John Stokesley, Bishop of London on 16 December 1531 in the house of Sir Thomas More.  After this sentence, without a king's writ for their warrant, the sheriffs of London, Richard Gresham and Edward Altam, took Tewkesbury into custody. On St. Thomas' eve, Sunday 20 December 1531, the sheriffs burned him at the stake opposite the Priory Church of St. Bartholomew's the Great, in West Smithfield, London.

The Great Bible
In 1538, King Henry VIII authorized Sir Thomas Cromwell, Vicar General and Secretary to King Henry VIII, to have an English edition of the Bible printed and read aloud during the Church of England's services.  The Great Bible of Henry VIII was prepared by Myles Coverdale and incorporated those translations by William Tyndale which the bishops found acceptable.  Published in April 1539, the first edition's 2,500 copies sold out quickly.

Modern culture
In 2013, Patrick Gabridge's Fire on Earth, a full-length historical drama in two acts, premiered in Boston. John Tewksbury's character in the play is a composite of Tewkesbury and fellow martyrs, including Richard Bayfield and Thomas Hitton.

See also
 English Reformation
 James Bainham
 Richard Bayfield
 Thomas Bilney
 John Fisher
 Thomas Hitton
 Thomas More
 William Tyndale

References

1531 deaths
16th-century English people
Protestant Reformers
British Protestants
16th-century executions by England
British merchants
Protestant martyrs of England